The Eugene (also known as 3 Manhattan West), located at 435 West 31st Street, is a residential tower that is part of the Manhattan West project, and broke ground in December 2014. In 2017, it was the tallest rental skyscraper in New York City. In total it has 844 units, split between 675 market-rate and 169 affordable. Among the building's amenities are La Palestra gym with a full-size basketball court and rock climbing wall, Bluestone Lane coffee shop, a rooftop terrace with a private bar, poker lounges, an arcade room, private piano rooms, an indoor golf simulation, a music studio, a library with study rooms, and a dog grooming station.

References

Chelsea, Manhattan
Hudson Yards, Manhattan
Residential buildings completed in 2017
Residential skyscrapers in Manhattan
Skidmore, Owings & Merrill buildings